Thomas Boland was a Scottish professional footballer who played as a half back. Boland was playing for St Joseph's, a Dundee Junior side when he became Dundee Hibernian's first-ever signing on 28 May 1909, four days after the club had been formed. He made his debut on 18 August 1909 in the club's first competitive match, a friendly with Edinburgh club Hibernian. Boland played his last game exactly eight years after his début and stayed with the club for a short spell as a trainer.

References

Dundee United F.C. players
Scottish footballers
Year of birth unknown
Year of death unknown
Place of death missing
Association football wing halves